The Valentine Poole houses are a terrace of grade II listed houses on The Green, Southgate, London. The houses were built in 1780 by the Valentine Poole Trust for the poor of Barnet. The architect was Michael Searles. The buildings were saved from demolition by Southgate Civic Trust and renovated by Peake Estates Limited in 1981.

References

External links

http://www.gilmartinley.co.uk/properties/for-sale/offices-b1/southgate/london/n14/21214
http://edithsstreets.blogspot.co.uk/2012/03/pymmes-brook-old-southgate.html

Grade II listed buildings in the London Borough of Enfield
Southgate, London
Houses in the London Borough of Enfield
Grade II listed houses in London